Juan Alberto Puiggari (born 21 November 1949) is an Argentinian clergyman. He has been the Roman Catholic Archbishop of Paraná since 2010.

Biography
Puiggari was born in Buenos Aires, Argentina. He was ordained as a priest on 13 November 1976. On 20 February 1998, Pope John Paul II appointed him as titular bishop of Turuzi and auxiliary bishop of Paraná. Later, on 7 June 2003, Pope John Paul II appointed him as Bishop of Mar del Plata. He received his current appointment as Archbishop of Paraná by Pope Benedict XVI on 4 November 2010.

References

External links

1949 births
Living people
21st-century Roman Catholic archbishops in Argentina
People from Buenos Aires
Roman Catholic bishops of Mar del Plata
Roman Catholic bishops of Paraná
Roman Catholic archbishops of Paraná
Argentine Roman Catholic archbishops